The 2012 Mid-Eastern Athletic Conference men's basketball tournament took place March 5–10, 2012 at the Lawrence Joel Veterans Memorial Coliseum in Winston-Salem, North Carolina. Norfolk State won the tournament and received an automatic bid into the 2012 NCAA tournament.  The 2012 championship game will be televised on ESPN2 at 1:00 PM eastern on March 10. This will be the final year in Winston-Salem, as the Tournament will move to Norfolk, VA beginning in 2013.

Format
With Savannah State and North Carolina Central now in the MEAC as full Division I members, the MEAC will have a new format for the 2012 tournament. The top three seeds will receive a first round bye.

Bracket

References

Tournament
MEAC men's basketball tournament